William Henry Marcus Miller Jr. (born June 14, 1959) is an American musician, songwriter, and record producer. He is best known for his work as a bassist. He has worked with trumpeter Miles Davis, pianist Herbie Hancock, singer Luther Vandross, and saxophonist David Sanborn, among others. He was the main songwriter and producer on three of Davis' albums: Tutu (1986), Music from Siesta (1987), and Amandla (1989). His collaboration with Vandross was especially close; he co-produced and served as the arranger for most of Vandross' albums, and he and Vandross co-wrote many of Vandross' songs, including the hits "I Really Didn't Mean It", "Any Love", "Power of Love/Love Power" and "Don't Want to Be a Fool". He also co-wrote the 1988 single "Da Butt" for Experience Unlimited.

Early life 
William Henry Marcus Miller Jr. was born in the Brooklyn borough of New York City on June 14, 1959. He grew up in a musical family; his father, William Miller, was a church organist and choir director. Through his father, he is the cousin of jazz pianist Wynton Kelly. He became classically trained as a clarinetist and later learned to play keyboards, saxophone, and guitar.

Career 

Miller began to work regularly in New York City, eventually playing bass and writing music for jazz flutist Bobbi Humphrey and keyboardist Lonnie Liston Smith. Miller became a session musician. Miller's earliest influences include James Jamerson and Larry Graham. He spent approximately 15 years performing as a session musician. During that time he also arranged and produced frequently. He was a member of the Saturday Night Live band between 1979 and 1981. He co-wrote Aretha Franklin's "Jump To It" along with Luther Vandross. He has played bass on over 500 recordings, appearing on albums by such artists as Michael Jackson, Beyoncé, Herbie Hancock, Mariah Carey, Eric Clapton, The Crusaders, Wayne Shorter, McCoy Tyner, Frank Sinatra, George Benson, Dr. John, Aretha Franklin, Elton John, Joe Walsh, Jean-Michel Jarre, Grover Washington Jr., Donald Fagen, Bill Withers, Bernard Wright, Kazumi Watanabe, Chaka Khan, LL Cool J and Flavio Sala. He won the "Most Valuable Player" award (given by NARAS to recognize studio musicians) three years in a row and was subsequently awarded "player emeritus" status and retired from eligibility.

In the mid-80s, Miller attempted a solo career as a funk/R&B singer, with the albums Suddenly (1983) and Marcus Miller (1984). He also served as the main songwriter, producer and instrumentalist on these albums. He has since then released ten more solo albums, although he has only occasionally sung on these subsequent albums.

Between 1988 and 1990, Miller was the musical director and house band bass player (in the "Sunday Night Band") during two seasons of the late-night TV show Sunday Night (also known as Night Music) on NBC, hosted by David Sanborn and Jools Holland.

As a composer, Miller co-wrote and produced several songs on the Miles Davis album Tutu, including the title track. He also composed "Chicago Song" for David Sanborn and co-wrote "'Til My Baby Comes Home", "It's Over Now", "For You to Love", and "Power of Love" for Luther Vandross.  Miller also wrote "Da Butt", which was featured in Spike Lee's School Daze. In addition, he composed and provided spoken vocals on "Burn it Up", which was featured on Najee's 1992 album Just An Illusion.

In 1997, he played bass guitar and bass clarinet in the supergroup Legends, featuring Eric Clapton (guitars and vocals), Joe Sample (piano), David Sanborn (alto sax) and Steve Gadd (drums). It was an 11-date tour of major jazz festivals in Europe. In 2008 Miller formed another supergroup, SMV, with fellow bassists Stanley Clarke and Victor Wooten, for a world tour lasting 18 months. He produced SMV's first release, Thunder. In the summer of 2011, Miller toured alongside Herbie Hancock and Wayne Shorter celebrating Miles Davis on the 20th anniversary of his passing.

Miller hosts a jazz history and influences show called Miller Time with Marcus Miller on the Real Jazz channel of Sirius XM Holdings satellite radio system. In addition to his recording and performance career, Miller has established a parallel career as a film score composer. He has written numerous scores for films, notably including films directed by Reginald Hudlin and Chris Rock.

Awards and honors 
Miller has been nominated for numerous Grammy Awards as a producer for Miles Davis, Luther Vandross, David Sanborn, Bob James, Chaka Khan and Wayne Shorter, and has won two Grammys.  He won a Grammy Award for Best R&B Song in 1992, for Luther Vandross' "Power of Love" and in 2001 he won for Best Contemporary Jazz Album for his seventh solo instrumental album, M². His 2015 album Afrodeezia earned a Grammy Award nomination for Best Contemporary Instrumental Album.

In 2012 Miller was appointed a UNESCO Artist for Peace, supporting and promoting the UNESCO Slave Route Project.

In December 2021, Bass Player magazine awarded Miller a Lifetime Achievement Award.

Instruments 
Miller is noted for playing a transparent blonde finish 1977 Fender Jazz Bass that was modified by luthier Roger Sadowsky with the addition of a Stars Guitar and later a Bartolini preamp so he could control his sound in the studio. Fender started to produce a Marcus Miller signature Fender Jazz Bass in four-string (made in Japan) and five-string (made in U.S) versions. Later, Fender moved the production of the four-string to their Mexico factory and discontinued both four- and five-string models in 2015. DR Strings also produced a series of Marcus Miller signature stainless steel strings known as "Fat Beams", which come in a variety of sizes.

As of 2015, Dunlop has begun producing Marcus Miller Super Bright bass strings which Miller has switched to. In 2015, Marcus began endorsing Sire Guitars, with whom he has a signature line of basses.

Discography

As leader

Studio albums 
 Suddenly (Warner Bros., 1983) – rec. 1982
 Marcus Miller (Warner Bros., 1984) – rec. 1983–84
 The Sun Don't Lie (Dreyfus Jazz, 1993)
 Tales (Dreyfus Jazz, 1995)
 M² (Telarc, 2001)
 The Ozell Tapes (Dreyfus Jazz, 2002)
 Silver Rain (Koch, 2005)
 Free (Dreyfus Jazz, 2007)
 Marcus (Concord, 2008)
 Thunder with SMV (Heads Up, 2008)
 Renaissance (Dreyfus Jazz, 2012)
 Afrodeezia (Blue Note, 2015)
 Laid Black (Blue Note, 2018)

Live albums 
 1994: Dreyfus Night in Paris with Michel Petrucciani, Biréli Lagrène, Kenny Garrett and Lenny White (Dreyfus Jazz, 2003)
 1996: Live & More (GRP, 1997)

 2002: The Ozell Tapes Live: The Official Bootleg (Telarc, 2002)[2CD]

 2009: A Night in Monte Carlo – Live 2009 with Monte-Carlo Philharmonic Orchestra (Dreyfus Jazz, 2010)
 2010: Tutu Revisited – Live 2010 (Dreyfus Jazz, 2011)[DVD-Video]

As a member 
The Jamaica Boys
 The Jamaica Boys (WEA, 1987)
 J. Boys (Reprise, 1990)

As sideman 

With Miles Davis
 The Man with the Horn (Columbia, 1981)
 We Want Miles (Columbia, 1982)
 Star People (Columbia, 1983)
 Tutu (Warner Bros., 1986)
 Music From Siesta (Warner Bros., 1987)
 Amandla (Warner Bros., 1989)
 The Complete Miles Davis at Montreux (Warner Bros., 2002) – rec.1973–91

With David Sanborn
 Hideaway (Warner Bros., 1980)
 Voyeur (Warner Bros., 1981) – rec. 1980
 As We Speak (Warner Bros., 1982)
 Backstreet (Warner Bros., 1983)
 Straight to the Heart (Warner Bros., 1984) – live
 Double Vision with Bob James (Warner Bros., 1986)
 Change of Heart (Warner Bros., 1987)
 Close-Up (Reprise, 1988)
 Another Hand (Elektra Musician, 1991)
 Upfront (Elektra, 1992)
 Hearsay (Elektra, 1994)
 Pearls (Elektra, 1995)
 Lovesongs (Warner Bros., 1995)
 Songs from the Night Before (Elektra Entertainment, 1996)
 Inside (Elektra, 1999)

With Luther Vandross
 Never Too Much (Epic, 1981)
 Busy Body (Epic, 1983)
 The Night I Fell in Love (Epic, 1985)
 Give Me the Reason (Epic, 1986) – rec. 1985–86
 Any Love (Epic, 1988)
 Power of Love (Epic, 1991) – rec. 1990–91
 Never Let Me Go (Epic, 1993) – rec. 1992–93
 This Is Christmas (Epic, 1995) – rec. 1994–95
 Your Secret Love (Epic, 1996) – rec. 1995–96
 I Know (Virgin, 1998)
 Luther Vandross (J, 2001)
 Dance with My Father (J, 2003) – rec. 2002-03

With Grover Washington Jr.
 Skylarkin' (Motown, 1980) – rec. 1979
 Winelight (Elektra, 1980)
 Come Morning (Elektra, 1981)
 The Best Is Yet to Come (Elektra, 1982)
 Inside Moves (Elektra, 1984)
 A House Full of Love (Columbia, 1986) – rec. 1985

With others
 Tom Browne, Browne Sugar (GRP, 1979)
 Don Cherry, Hear & Now (Atlantic, 1977) – rec. 1976
 The Crusaders, Healing the Wounds (GRP, 1991)
 Donald Fagen, The Nightfly (Warner Bros., 1982)
 Bryan Ferry, Boys and Girls (E.G., 1985) – rec. 1983–85
 Aretha Franklin, Get It Right (Arista, 1983)
 Dizzy Gillespie, Closer to the Source (Atlantic, 1984)
 Dave Grusin, Mountain Dance (Arista, 1980)
 Jean-Michel Jarre, Zoolook (Dreyfus, 1984) – rec. 1982–84
 Wayne Shorter, High Life (Verve, 1995)
 Lonnie Liston Smith, Dreams of Tomorrow (Doctor Jazz, 1983)
 Bernard Wright, Nard (GRP, 1981) – rec. 1980

Film scores 
1987: Siesta
1990: House Party (featuring Kid 'n Play)
1992: Boomerang (featuring Eddie Murphy)
1994: Above the Rim (featuring Tupac Shakur)
1994: A Low Down Dirty Shame (featuring Keenen Ivory Wayans)
1996: The Great White Hype (featuring Samuel L. Jackson)
1997: The Sixth Man (featuring Marlon Wayans)
1999: An American Love Story
2000: The Ladies Man (featuring Tim Meadows)
2001: The Trumpet of the Swan (featuring Reese Witherspoon)
2001: The Brothers (featuring Morris Chestnut)
2001: Two Can Play That Game (featuring Vivica A. Fox)
2002: Serving Sara (featuring Matthew Perry)
2003: Deliver Us from Eva (featuring LL Cool J)
2003: Head of State (featuring Chris Rock)
2004: Breakin' All the Rules (featuring Jamie Foxx)
2005: King's Ransom (featuring Anthony Anderson)
2006: Save the Last Dance 2 (featuring Izabella Miko)
2007: I Think I Love My Wife (featuring Chris Rock)
2007: This Christmas (featuring Idris Elba)
2009: Good Hair (Chris Rock documentary)
2009: Obsessed (featuring Beyoncé Knowles)
2012: Think Like a Man
2014: About Last Night
2017: Marshall
2020: Safety

Media appearances 
In 2017, Miller appeared on the Armenian talk show Nice Evening.

References

External links 

 
 

1959 births
Living people
Musicians from Brooklyn
American jazz composers
American male jazz composers
American jazz bass guitarists
American rock bass guitarists
American funk bass guitarists
American male bass guitarists
American rhythm and blues bass guitarists
Jazz fusion bass guitarists
American multi-instrumentalists
American session musicians
Bass clarinetists
Fiorello H. LaGuardia High School alumni
Grammy Award winners
MNRK Music Group artists
Miles Davis
Smooth jazz bass guitarists
African-American jazz musicians
Guitarists from New York (state)
20th-century American guitarists
Saturday Night Live Band members
Jazz musicians from New York (state)
21st-century clarinetists
SMV (band) members
Officers of the Order of Cultural Merit (Monaco)
Jamaica Boys members
African-American guitarists